Fame: The Original Soundtrack from the Motion Picture is the soundtrack from the film of the same name, released in 1980 by RSO Records. In 2003, it was reissued on CD with three bonus tracks, which was then reissued again in 2009 and 2012.

Release and singles 
The motion picture soundtrack album for Fame was released in the U.S. on May 16, 1980, by RSO Records. It features nine songs, all of which appear in various scenes in the film. In his later review for AllMusic, Stephen Thomas Erlewine awarded the album five stars out of five and wrote, "Yes, the production techniques often do sound dated ... but the music by Michael Gore is dynamic, varied, and alive, sung with real passion and vigor, and it still retains its essential spark 23 years after it was a pop culture phenomenon."

In the US, the title song "Fame" was released as a single in May 1980, and reached number 4 on Billboards Hot 100 chart while the album reached number 7 on the Billboard 200 chart. A second single, "Out Here on My Own", was released in August and reached number 19 on the Hot 100 chart, while the third single "Red Light" by Linda Clifford was number 41.

"Fame" was released in the UK at the end of June, however, it failed to chart. The album was released in the following month, peaking at number 21 on the UK Albums Chart. "Out Here on My Own" was also released in the UK and it too failed to chart. However, in June 1982, after the success of the Fame TV series, "Fame" was re-released, topping the Singles Chart for three weeks, spending a total of 16 weeks on the chart and it became the second biggest selling single in the United Kingdom of 1982. After its success, the Fame album was also re-released and also topped the Album Charts. In August, "Out Here on My Own" was re-released, peaking at number 58.

Track listing

Personnel

Musicians 
Vocalists

 Eric Brockington – lead vocals (9), backing vocals (3, 9), tambourine (3, 9)
 Irene Cara – lead vocals (1, 2, 3, 9), backing vocals (1, 3)
 Laura Dean – lead vocals (9)
 Linda Clifford – lead vocals (5)
 Paul McCrane – lead vocals (4, 6, 9), guitar (6)
 Traci Parnell – lead vocals (9), backing vocals (3, 9), tambourine (3, 9)
 Contemporary Gospel Chorus of the High School of Music and Art – vocals (7)
 Alan Vetter – backing vocals (9)
 Amy Wheeler – backing vocals (9)
 Ann Roboff – backing vocals (9)
 Ann E. Sutton – backing vocals (1, 3)
 Annie Roboff – backing vocals (3)
 Anthony Evans – backing vocals (3, 9), tambourine (3, 9)
 Anthony Ogburn – backing vocals (3)
 April Lang – backing vocals (3, 9)
 Ben Werblolowsky – backing vocals (9)
 Cheryl Questell – backing vocals (3)
 Cheryl Williams – backing vocals (9)

 Darryl Ware – backing vocals (9), tambourine (9)
 Deborah McDuffie – backing vocals (1)
 Delphia Shipman – backing vocals (9), tambourine (9)
 Denise Andrades – backing vocals (9)
 Derek Cheeley – backing vocals (9)
 Desiree Lindsay – backing vocals (3), tambourine (3)
 Gordon Sayles – backing vocals (3, 9), tambourine (3)
 Jean Deetjin – backing vocals (9)
 Judith Charlton – backing vocals (9)
 Julie Cohen – backing vocals (9)
 Kevin Windley – backing vocals (9)
 Kim Carlson – backing vocal (3)
 Ladd Boris – backing vocals (9)
 Lance Gross – backing vocals (9)
 Leonard Battle – backing vocals (9)
 Lillian Miller – backing vocals (9)
 Linda Jefferson – backing vocals (9)
 Lisa Herman – backing vocals (3, 9)
 Lisa Lowell – backing vocals (3, 9)
 Louise Bethune – backing vocals (1, 3)
 Luanne Holder – backing vocals (9)
 Luther Vandross – backing vocals (1)
 Maeretha Stewart – backing vocals (5)
 Mary Wormworth – backing vocals (3)
 Monica Dizzoza – backing vocals (9)

 Nanette Dermanjian – backing vocals (9)
 Nanette Schwersenz – backing vocals (9)
 Peggi Blu – backing vocals (1)
 Ralph Dujour – backing vocals (9)
 Raul Lugo – backing vocals (9)
 Robert Bostwick – backing vocals (9)
 Robert Koch – backing vocals (3, 9)
 Rodney Gray – backing vocals (9)
 Saundra Evans – backing vocals (9)
 Shirley Jiha – backing vocals (9)
 Thais Hockaday – backing vocals (3)
 Ullanda McCullough – backing vocals (1, 5)
 Vicki Sue Robinson – backing vocals (1, 3)
 Wanda Tanks – backing vocals (9)
 Willie Henry Jr. – backing vocals (3, 9)
 Vivian Cherry – backing vocals (5)
 Yvette Carrington – backing vocals (9)
 Yvonne Lewis – backing vocals (1)

String and keyboard musicians

 Billy Cross – guitar (9)
 Cliff Morris – guitar (4)
David Spinozza – guitar (1)
 Elliott Randall – guitar solo (1)
Jeff Layton – guitar (4)
 Jeff Mironov – guitar (1, 5)
 Ross Traut – guitar (5)
 Steve Khan – guitar (5)
Michael Monaco – electric guitar (3)
Gene Santini – bass (9)
Marcus Miller – bass (4)
 Neil Jason – bass (1, 3, 5)
Cliff Carter – keyboards (5)
 Leon Pendarvis – keyboards (1)
 Rob Mounsey – keyboards (1), piano (4)
Frank Owens – piano (2)
 Lee Curreri – piano (3)
 Michael Gore – piano (8)
 Ray Chew – piano (3), keyboards (5)
 Steve Margoshes – piano (9)
 Wade Lassister – piano (7)
 Ken Bichel – synthesizer (1)
 Suzanne Ciani – synthesizer (4)
 Tim Tobias – synthesizer (5)
Alla Goldberg – cello (9)

 Carolyn Halif – cello (9)
 Holly Singer – cello (9)
 Jesse Levy – cello (4)
 Jonathan Abramowitz – cello (3, 4)
 Lawrence Lenske – cello (9)
 Maurice Bialkin – cello (3, 9)
 Richard Locker – cello (4, 9)
 Seymour Barab – cello (3)
 Donald Palma – double bass (9)
 John Beal – double bass (4, 9)
 Lewis Paer – double bass (9)
 Ralph Oxman – double bass (9)
 Ron Carter – double bass (4)
Carolyn Voight – viola (9)
 Evelyn Glover – viola (9)
 Harold Coletta – viola (9)
 Helen C. Huybrechts – viola (9)
 Judy Geist – viola (4)
 Julien Barber – viola (4)
 Lenore Weinstock – viola (4)
 Maureen Gallagher – viola (4)
 Seymour Berman – viola (9)
 Sue Pray – viola (9)
 Adam Abeshouse – electric violin (3)
 Alphonse Schipani – violin (9)

 Arianne Bronne – violin (9)
 Carmel Malin – violin (9)
 Diana Halprin – violin (4)
 Frederick Buldrini – violin (4, 9)
 Harold Kohon – violin (4)
 Israel Chorberg – violin (9)
 Jean Ingraham – violin (9)
 Joe Malin – violin (4, 9)
 Joseph Rabushka – violin (4)
 Joyce Flissler – violin (9)
 Kathryn Kienke – violin (9)
 Lamar Alsop – violin (4)
 Leo Kahn – violin (9)
 Leon Goldstein – violin (9)
 Leonore Walaniuk – violin (9)
 Lewis Eley – violin (4)
 Marilyn Wright – violin (9)
 Max Ellen – violin (4)
 Max Hollander – violin (9)
 Peter Dimitriades – violin (9)
 Peter VanDerwater – violin (9)
 Regis Iandiorio – violin (4, 9)
 Sanford Allen – violin (4)
 Suzanne Ornstein – violin (9)
 Tony Posk – violin (4)

Brass and wind musicians

 Donald MacCourt – bassoon (9)
 Loren Glickman – bassoon (9)
Charles Russo – clarinet (9)
 William Blount – clarinet (9)
 Andrew Lolya – flute (9)
 Julius Baker – flute (9)
 Phil Bodner – flute (9)
 Al Richmond – French horn (9)
 Peter Gordon – French horn (9)
 Ron Sell – French horn (9)
 Sharon Moe – French horn (9)

 Don Frank Brooks – harmonica (3)
 George Marge – oboe (9)
 Marsha Heller – oboe (9)
 Dave Tofani – alto saxophone (3)
 David Glasser – alto saxophone (3)
 George Young – alto saxophone (5)
 Ronnie Cuber – baritone saxophone (5)
 Denny Morouse – tenor saxophone (3)
 Harold Vick – tenor saxophone (5)
 David Taylor – bass trombone (5), trombone (9)
 Barry Rogers – tenor trombone (5)

 Dave Bargeron – tenor trombone (5)
Eddie Bert – trombone (9)
 Harry DiVito – trombone (9)
 Chris Rogers – trumpet (3)
 Danny Cahn – trumpet (9)
 James Sedlar – trumpet (9)
 Jon Faddis – trumpet (5)
 Lew Soloff – trumpet (9)
 Mike Lawrence – trumpet (3)
 Randy Brecker – trumpet (5)

Drum and percussion musicians

Allan Schwartzberg – drums (9)
 Yogi Horton – drums (1)
 Bob Fisher – drums (3)
 Steve Jordan – drums (5)

 Chris Parker – drums (4)
 'Crusher' Bennett – percussion (1)
 Gordon Gottlieb – percussion (9)
 James Ogden – percussion (9)

 Jimmy Maelen – percussion (1, 5)
 Michael Levenson – percussion (9)
 Tony Lewis – percussion (3)

Technical

 Chuck Irwin – recording engineer
 Frank Kulaga – recording engineer, mixing engineer
 Lincoln Clapp – assistant engineer
 Bernie Grundman – mastering engineer
 Gil Askey – arrangement (5), producer (5)

 Leon Pendarvis – arrangement (1)
 Steve Margoshes – arrangement (4, 9)
 Norman Hollyn – music editorial coordinator
 Pamela Adler – production coordination
 Artie Kaplan – music contractor

 Earl Shendell – music contractor
 Sephra Herman – music contractor
 Glenn Ross – art direction and design
 Tim Owens – art direction and design

Charts

Weekly charts

Year-end charts

Sales and certifications

References

1980 soundtrack albums
RSO Records soundtracks
Musical film soundtracks
Scores that won the Best Original Score Academy Award